Mayor Synagogue (or Synagogue Mejor) is a synagogue on Arap Şükrü (Sakarya) Street in Bursa, Turkey. It was founded by Jews who settled in the Ottoman Empire after being expelled from Majorca.  The present building was built in the 15th century or the late 16th century.

The synagogue was in regular use until 1975, when it was closed due to financial constraints. Researchers who visited in 1996 found it abandoned and in danger of demolition. However, according to the Turkish government, the building is still used for special events and for washing the dead.

There is another synagogue in Bursa: Geruş Synagogue.

See also
History of the Jews in Turkey
List of synagogues in Turkey
Mayor Synagogue, Istanbul

References and notes

Buildings and structures in Bursa
Culture in Bursa
Sephardi Jewish culture in Turkey
Sephardi synagogues
Spanish-Jewish diaspora
Synagogues in Turkey